Catford Stadium was a historic greyhound racing stadium in Catford, a suburb of London.

Origins
Charles Benstead and Frank Sutton founded the stadium on Southern Railway land between two commuter lines in 1932. The entrance was on Adenmore Road, West of Doggett Road.

Greyhound Racing

Opening
The inaugural meeting was held on Saturday 30 July 1932 and consisted of a seven card race of events comprising four or five runners. Mick the Miller was paraded around the track prior to the fourth race. The first racing manager was Lt. Col. A J Vernon and there were no less than eighty bookmakers. A kennel complex was constructed at Layham's Farm, Keston, near Biggin Hill and six trainers were appointed.

The track was described as a tight 369 yard circumference circuit and the hare was an 'Outside Breco Silent' before being switched to a more conventional 'Outside McKee'. Buses originally dropped patrons off just outside the main gates and by the entrance gates were tote facilities and the South bank enclosure. The West forecourt had a covered grandstand with tote facilities with the judges box directly opposite the winning line. Behind this was the race day kennels. The East forecourt had a larger covered grandstand on the back straight. The track could also be accessed from behind this grandstand because there were two bridges going across the Southern Railway line. To use the bridges to the track an entrance fee was paid at the turnstiles situated on the other side of the railway line to the stadium itself meaning the bridges were actually part of the stadium complex. Finally opposite the main entrance on bends 3 and 4 was the famous tote board nestled between the uncovered north bank
enclosure.

Pre War history
Early trainers at the track were Jock Hutchinson, H Hammond, Claude Champion, Albert Bedford, Harry Woolner, Dal Hawkesley and Ernie Pratt and a major event 'The Gold Collar' was introduced in 1933 which would gain classic status. Two other events called the Catford British Breeders Produce Stakes and Cobb Marathon Bowl were introduced; the former became very popular with the event being run twice during many years and the latter was sponsored by brewer Rupert Cobb and became a significant test for the leading staying stars, this race would continue until 1975.

Post War history

Tote turnover after the war was extremely healthy and the seventh best in London and Great Britain just ahead of West Ham Stadium. On 20 September 1946 an express train from Victoria to Ramsgate derailed and five of the ten coaches fell down the 20 foot embankment landing in the stadium car park. The stadium employees were first on to the scene and remarkably only one person died as a result of the crash.

In 1952 the Managing Director Frank Sutton died; Sutton had introduced the British Breeders Produce Stakes. His son John would eventually take over from his father and take over the family business and introduced the very first jackpot pool in 1961, later to be copied by horse racing. In 1954 the Dave Barker trainer Ardskeagh Ville was the first and only hound from Catford to make the English Greyhound Derby final. Charles Benstead sold his share in the company in 1959 to Harold Clifton.

By 1963 the Greyhound Racing Association purchased the track and John Sutton eventually become their Managing Director. The GRA introduced under track heating system at Catford with electric cables sewn into the track eight inches under the turf. Sister track Charlton Stadium finished racing during 1971 resulting in the Greenwich Cup and Ben Truman Stakes finding a new home at Catford. One year later the track was the first London stadium to start eight dog racing and the circuit was substantially altered with steep banking on the bends.

During the 1970s trainers at the track would include Mike Smith, John Horsfall and Paddy Milligan. The legendary Scurlogue Champ set three track records over marathon distances of 718 and 888 metres from 1984-1986 and in 1987 the Scurry Gold Cup became another major event to be held at the track, the classic race arrived from Harringay Stadium after its closure.

The Cesarewitch was switched to from Belle Vue Stadium to Catford in 1995 before switching to Oxford Stadium later.

Controversy
During 2001–2002, a trainer Lennie Knell was caught on camera admitting overfeeding dogs to slow them down, and a greyhound died of heat exhaustion. Subsequently, the Greyhound Board of Great Britain brought in stringent rules that required every stadium and greyhound transporter to have cool air management systems and any trainer found deliberately overfeeding dogs would lose their licence. Knell was disqualified from all licensed greyhound tracks in May 2002 after an inquiry by the governing body.

Closure
On 6 November 2003, following years of rumours, the track closed overnight without warning, when it was announced the previous day's race meeting had been the last.

Trainers John Simpson, Tony Taylor, Maxine Locke and John Walsh moved to Wimbledon, Keston based Steve Gammon left for Crayford, Sonja Spiers and Kevin Connor went to Sittingbourne and Mark Lavender switched to Portsmouth. Racing Manager Derek Hope was able to take up the same position at Wimbledon soon after because Simon Harris had left for Coventry Stadium bookmaker John Humphreys who had stood in the main ring since 1966 and sponsored the Gold Collar for 18 years, retired.

Speedway
In 1934 several speedway meetings were held on a track constructed inside the dog track. In 1949 permission was sought to operate speedway from the stadium again but permission was refused.  Not to be confused with The Mount stadium, another stadium in Catford.

Redevelopment
The local amateur football side, Catford Wanderers, were mooted to move into the stadium, though this dream was never realised. The stadium has since caught on fire and was subsequently demolished, along with the iconic tote board. The site has been redeveloped for housing by Barratt Homes as "Catford Green".

Competitions

Gold Collar
(an original classic competition)

Greenwich Cup

Scurry Gold Cup
(an original classic competition)

Cesarewitch
(an original classic competition)

Cobb Marathon Bowl

Ben Truman Stakes

(1962-67 New Cross), (1969–70 Charlton), (1971-87 Catford)

Track records
Pre-metric

Post-metric

External links
Pictures at Derelict London
More Pictures
Catford Greyhound Racing History

References

Defunct greyhound racing venues in the United Kingdom
Sport in the London Borough of Lewisham
Defunct speedway venues in England
Defunct sports venues in London
Catford
Sports venues completed in 1932
Defunct greyhound racing venues in London
Greyhound racing in London
Demolished sports venues in the United Kingdom